John Klintberg (6 February 1885 – 16 December 1955) was a Swedish athlete. He competed in the men's individual cross country event at the 1912 Summer Olympics.

References

External links

1885 births
1955 deaths
Athletes (track and field) at the 1912 Summer Olympics
Swedish male long-distance runners
Olympic athletes of Sweden
Athletes from Stockholm
Olympic cross country runners